Eastern SkyJets was a charter airline, with full infrastructure based at Dubai International Airport, and Ras Al Khaima airport.

Operations
ESJ had been operating flights in the Middle East, Africa, Europe, Asia, and the Subcontinent region, under its own UAE Air Operator Certificate (AOC) and CAR145 Approved Maintenance Organization.

Hostile Areas Experience
ESJ was a specialist in hostile areas with extensive experience in the Afghanistan territory, and operated daily scheduled charter flights for AeroTech Aviation, connecting Dubai with the military airfields of Kandahar, Bagram, and Camp Bastion in Afghanistan.

ESJ Customers
Eastern SkyJets was a key regional air transport provider, with clientele ranging from a number of multinational blue chip companies, to government organizations, such as the US Government, the United Nations, and various military organizations. 

Eastern SkyJets was the only UAE registered passenger charter airline to be approved by the United Nations World Food Programme (UNWFP), and held the contract for its Kabul–Dubai service.

End of Operations
The carrier ended operations in 2016.

Fleet

The Eastern SkyJets fleet consisted of the following aircraft (as of August 2016):

The airline fleet previously included the following aircraft (as of August 2014):
 1 Boeing 737-400
 1 Douglas DC-9-32
 1 Douglas DC-9-51

External links

Eastern SkyJets

References

Defunct airlines of the United Arab Emirates
Airlines established in 2004
Airlines disestablished in 2016
Emirati companies established in 2004